Banning High School can refer to:
 Phineas Banning High School in Wilmington, Los Angeles, California
 Banning High School (Banning, California) in Banning, California